Marta Lewicka (born 23 November 1972) is a Polish-American professor of mathematics at the University of Pittsburgh, specializing in mathematical analysis. Lewicka has contributed results in the theory of hyperbolic systems of conservation laws, fluid dynamics, calculus of variations, nonlinear elasticity, nonlinear potential theory and differential games.

Career
Lewicka earned bachelor's and master's degrees in mathematics in 1996 from the University of Gdańsk, and a second engineering bachelor's degree in computer science in 1998 from Częstochowa University of Technology. She completed her Ph.D. in 2000 from the International School for Advanced Studies in Trieste, Italy under the supervision of Alberto Bressan. After postdoctoral research at the Max Planck Institute for Mathematics in the Sciences in Leipzig, Germany and a term as L.E. Dickson Instructor at the University of Chicago, she joined the University of Minnesota faculty in 2005. She moved in 2010 to Rutgers University, and again in 2011 to the University of Pittsburgh. 

In 2016, she gave an AMS invited address at the AMS/MAA Joint Mathematical Meetings in the area of nonlinear elasticity and geometry of prestrained materials. In 2017, she gave a Howard Rowlee Lecture. In 2017, she received Professor's scientific title, awarded in Poland by the President of the Republic of Poland. In 2018, she received a Simons Fellowship in Mathematics. She was elected a Fellow of the American Mathematical Society in the Class of 2021, with citation "For contributions to partial differential equations, calculus of variations, and continuum mechanics." In 2022 she was a fellow of the Lady Davis Foundation and a visiting professor at the Hebrew University of Jerusalem.
In 2023-2024 she is the Vice Chair of the Society for Industrial and Applied Mathematics Activity Group on Analysis of Partial Differential Equations.

Books

External links
Marta Lewicka's Home Page
Mathematical Genealogy of Marta Lewicka
Notices of The American Mathematical Society expository paper based on Lewicka's AMS Invited address, pages 8-11

References

1972 births
Living people
21st-century American mathematicians
Polish mathematicians
Polish women mathematicians
University of Gdańsk alumni
University of Minnesota faculty
Rutgers University faculty
University of Pittsburgh faculty
21st-century women mathematicians
Fellows of the American Mathematical Society